Roger Martí Salvador (born 3 January 1991), known as Roger, is a Spanish professional footballer who plays as a forward for La Liga club Cádiz CF on loan from Elche CF.

Club career

Valencia
Born in Torrent, Valencian Community, Roger graduated from local Valencia CF's youth system. In January 2011, after a handful of games with the reserves, he was loaned to neighbouring amateurs Burjassot CF.

Levante
In July 2011, Roger signed with another team in the community, Levante UD, being assigned to the B team in Tercera División. He made his debut with the main squad on 21 December, replacing injured Juanlu in a 4–1 home win against Deportivo de La Coruña in the round of 32 of the Copa del Rey (5–4 aggregate win).

Roger made his La Liga debut on 15 January 2012, taking the place of Xavi Torres for the last ten minutes of the 3–0 away loss to Athletic Bilbao. Four days earlier he scored his first goal with Levante's first team, the second in a 4–0 home defeat of AD Alcorcón in the domestic cup (5–2 on aggregate).

Roger netted his first top-flight goal on 2 December 2012, helping to a 1–1 draw at RC Celta de Vigo. On 6 August 2013, he was loaned to Real Zaragoza of Segunda División for one year.

On 8 July 2014, Roger joined Real Valladolid also in the second division, in a season-long loan deal. He appeared sparingly for the club mainly due to a knee injury suffered in September, only returning to the fields in April.

Roger returned to Valladolid on loan, on 28 January 2016. He scored a brace in a 2–2 home draw against CD Numancia on 21 February, and finished the campaign with eight goals.

Roger returned to Levante for 2016–17, with the club now in the second tier. He netted twice against AD Alcorcón (2–0 home win) and former sides Zaragoza and Valladolid (respectively 4–2 and 3–2 home victories), as well as once in a 2–2 away draw with UD Almería, taking his tally up to seven in only ten matches; he went on to rank second in the goal charts at 22, helping to a return to the top flight as champions.

Roger suffered another knee injury in the 2017 pre-season, being sidelined for six months. On 29 June 2018, he extended his contract until 2023. 

On 20 October 2018, Roger scored from the penalty spot to contribute to a 2–1 victory over Real Madrid at the Santiago Bernabéu Stadium. He finished the season with a squad-best 13 goals, repeating the feat in the following with 11.

Elche
On 4 August 2022, after Levante's relegation, Roger remained in the top flight after signing a four-year contract with Elche CF. The following 26 January, he moved to Cádiz CF on loan for the remainder of the season.

Honours
Levante
Segunda División: 2016–17

References

External links

1991 births
Living people
People from Torrent, Valencia
Sportspeople from the Province of Valencia
Spanish footballers
Footballers from the Valencian Community
Association football forwards
La Liga players
Segunda División players
Segunda División B players
Tercera División players
Valencia CF Mestalla footballers
Atlético Levante UD players
Levante UD footballers
Real Zaragoza players
Real Valladolid players
Elche CF players
Cádiz CF players